Higher Learning is a 1995 American drama film written and directed by John Singleton and starring an ensemble cast. The film follows the changing lives of three incoming freshmen at the fictional Columbus University: Malik Williams (Omar Epps), a track star who struggles with academics; Kristen Connor (Kristy Swanson), a shy and naive girl; and Remy (Michael Rapaport), a lonely and confused man seemingly out of place in his new environment.

The film also featured Tyra Banks' first performance in a theatrical film. Laurence Fishburne won an NAACP Image Award for "Outstanding Supporting Actor in a Motion Picture"; Ice Cube was also nominated for the award. This was the last film appearance of Dedrick D. Gobert, who was shot dead in 1994 prior to the film's release.

The exterior shots and outdoor scenes were shot on the campus of University of California, Los Angeles (UCLA) while the interiors were shot at Sony Pictures Studios.

Plot 

Three incoming freshmen at fictional Columbus University are introduced: Kristen Connor, a friendly but naive white girl; Remy, a quiet young white man; and Malik Williams, a black high-school track-star attending college on an athletic scholarship.

Kristen's roommate Monet and Malik attend a dorm party hosted by Remy's militantly Afrocentric roommate Fudge White, a senior. Upset at the loud rap music being played so late as he attempts to study, Remy contacts campus police to break up the party. Fudge complains that the white police officers severely punish the black students yet ignore the room down the hall playing equally-loud "hillbilly" music. En route back to her dorm, Kristen meets Taryn, an openly-lesbian junior, who warns her about walking alone late at night and invites her to a student group.

Malik and Kristen's introductory political science class is taught by Professor Maurice Phipps, a conservative black man from the West Indies, who challenges the class to determine their own identity rather than letting others categorize them.

Fudge and his friend Dreads play loud music, which disrupts Remy's studying. When Remy complains, Fudge just threatens him. Remy moves out and gets a new roommate David, who is Jewish. Later, Remy loses at a video game to Malik who further mocks him.

Frat boy Billy rapes a drunken Kristen. Monet finds Kristen crying on her bed then fields a call from Billy who uses a racial slur when she does not let him speak to Kristen. Angered, Monet turns to Fudge who recruits his friends to confront Billy at a frat party. Kristen points out Billy to the black students who pull him outside and force him to apologize to Monet (unaware that he raped Kristen).

Kristen joins Taryn's student group on harmony between different races and cliques, eventually opening up to her about her rape. Taryn urges Kristen to report the rape while attempting to console her. As days pass, Kristen becomes increasingly attracted to Taryn.

Becoming increasingly isolated, Remy is treated to a drink by white supremacist and neo-Nazi skinhead Scott Moss, eventually befriending Scott's skinhead friends Erik, James, and hulking weight-lifter Knocko.

Malik confronts Phipps about a paper, arguing for a better grade. When Phipps explains the various spelling and grammar errors, Malik calls him a sellout for the "white establishment". Phipps angrily responds that the world owes Malik nothing and that Malik must work for himself to make a difference in the world. When Malik's teammates confront him over a poor performance at a track meet, he responds with Fudge's militant Afrocentric ideology. He walks away and flirts with fellow runner Deja, who becomes his girlfriend and shows him how to write a better essay.

Remy increasingly spends time with Scott and his gang. Scott, preaching his racist beliefs, gradually convinces the troubled Remy that "the white man is endangered". After shaving his head, Remy is welcomed into Scott's group.

After attending a rape awareness rally with Taryn, Kristen asks to spend the night. Taryn rebuffs her, wanting Kristen to be sure. Kristen eventually starts separate relationships with Wayne and Taryn who are unaware that Kristen is sleeping with both of them.

After confronting Malik with racial slurs, Remy later pulls a handgun on Malik and David, hurling racial slurs at them both as he packs his belongings and drops out of the university. Again, Sergeant Bradley assumes Malik is at fault and lets Remy escape. Malik moves in with Fudge and his fellow roommates, while Remy moves in with Scott and his fellow Neo-Nazis. Fudge's gang wins a rumble against Scott's. Scott convinces Remy not to drop out of Columbus because the white supremacists need not only soldiers, but also educated people, such as lawyers, to fight for their cause. Yet Remy, intimidated by Malik, considers violence to be inevitable and therefore the only answer. When Remy insists that he is "for real", Scott shows him a collection of guns, including a sniper rifle, which he keeps hidden in his dorm. Scott challenges Remy to kill for the white race.

Kristen and Monet organize a peace festival for their fellow students, with Malik and Deja attending. Remy opens fire, with Scott's rifle, from a rooftop. Deja is hit and dies in Malik's arms. Malik intercepts Remy and tries to strangle him to avenge Deja's death, but the campus police prevent him from doing this, and viciously beat Malik while Remy suffers a nervous breakdown. Remy tearfully apologizes for all that he has done and then turns his gun on himself before Sergeant Bradley can stop him, and commits suicide. Shortly after, Moss and his gang hear the news about Remy's actions and death and start chanting Neo-Nazi mottos.

A few days later, Malik and Phipps discuss his future at the university. Phipps displays his trust in Malik's judgment. Later, Malik and Kristen – who is also taking Phipps' course but has never spent time with Malik until today – chat near a statue of Christopher Columbus which has been converted into a memorial site. Kristen feels responsible for Deja's death because it was Monet's and her Peace Fest, but Malik insists she's not.

Fudge and Taryn (among others) graduate from Columbus University, with the CU flag girls performing for their commencement-ceremony. The film's closing shot finds Phipps strolling from his office underneath The American flag fluttering in the wind; the caption "unlearn" is typewritten over the flag.

Cast
 Omar Epps as Malik Williams
 Kristy Swanson as Kristen Connor
 Michael Rapaport as Remy 
 Ice Cube as "Fudge" White
 Jennifer Connelly as Taryn
 Tyra Banks as Deja
 Regina King as Monet
 Jason Wiles as Wayne
 Cole Hauser as Scott Moss
 Busta Rhymes as "Dreads"
 Laurence Fishburne as Professor Maurice Phipps
 Bradford English as Officer Bradley
 Jay R. Ferguson as Billy
 Andrew Bryniarski as Knocko
 Trevor St. John as James
 Talbert Morton as Erik
 Adam Goldberg as David Isaacs
 Bridgette Wilson as Nicole
 Kari Wuhrer as Claudia
 Randall Batinkoff as Chad Shadowhill
 Dedrick D. Gobert as Fudge's Homie
 Malcolm Norrington as Cory
 Morris Chestnut as Track Anchor (uncredited)
 Jeanette Bolden as Deja Track Coach (uncredited)

The band Eve's Plum performs, as Themselves, at the Peace Fest.

Reception  
Higher Learning grossed $38,290,723 in the United States, with $20,200,000 in rentals. It ranked #44 for yearly domestic gross and #17 amongst R-rated films in 1995.

For their performances in Higher Learning, Laurence Fishburne and Ice Cube were nominated for the 1996 Image Award for Outstanding Supporting Actor in a Motion Picture. Fishburne won.

Critical response  
The film received mixed reviews. Roger Ebert commended John Singleton's direction of the film: "He sees with a clear eye and a strong will, and is not persuaded by fashionable ideologies. His movies are thought-provoking because he uses familiar kinds of characters and then asks hard questions about them." He awarded the film 3 out of 4 stars.
Time Out wrote: "a stylish, intelligent film-maker, Singleton interweaves the threads of his demographic tapestry with assurance, passion and a welcome awareness of the complexities of the college community's contradictory impulses towards integration and separatism."
Writing in The New York Times, Janet Maslin felt that the movie fell short of its goal, saying it "turns out to be an inadvertent example of the same small-mindedness it deplores".
Reel Film Reviews wrote that the film is "consistently entertaining and well-acted all around. While it's not a perfect movie – Cube's character disappears for a 30-minute stretch and Singleton's approach often veers into heavy-handedness – it is nevertheless an intriguing look at the differences between races and how such differences can clash", and awarded it 3.5 stars out of 4.
Higher Learning holds a 45% rating on Rotten Tomatoes based on 40 reviews, with an average rating of 5.20/10. The site's consensus states; "It's hard to fault Higher Learnings goals; unfortunately, writer-director John Singleton too often struggles to fit his themes within a consistently engaging story." On Metacritic, it has a score of 54% based on review from 20 critics.
Singleton commented: "If you look at Higher Learning, which I was 25 years old making it, I'm like chock full of everything that would concern young people: lesbianism, and racism, and everything I could put in that movie. It was a great movie. A fun movie to do. But you could never get that movie made now. Never. The guy shoots everybody, know what I mean?"

Soundtrack  

The soundtrack, containing hip hop, R&B, rock and jazz music, was released on January 3, 1995 by John Singleton's New Deal Music label through 550 Music/Epic Soundtrax. It peaked at number 39 on the Billboard 200 and number 9 on the Top R&B/Hip-Hop Albums.
In addition to "Higher", performed by Ice Cube, the soundtrack includes original music by OutKast, Liz Phair, Tori Amos and Rage Against the Machine.

Pop culture
The character Malik, played by the same actor, Omar Epps, appears in Don't Be a Menace to South Central While Drinking Your Juice in the Hood, a comedy movie who parodied some known black movies of 1990s – a year later, after his mates graduation, Malik had returned to the university where he was shot and killed by a new Skinheads member, who also dealt with few others black activists, including fictional character Radio Raheem.

References

External links 
 
 
 

1995 films
1995 crime drama films
1995 LGBT-related films
1995 romantic drama films
American crime drama films
American LGBT-related films
American romantic drama films
Female bisexuality in film
Columbia Pictures films
Films scored by Stanley Clarke
Films about academia
Films about race and ethnicity
Films about racism in the United States
Films about neo-Nazism
Films about school violence
Films directed by John Singleton
Films set in universities and colleges
Films shot in California
Films shot in Los Angeles
Lesbian-related films
Films about rape in the United States
Films with screenplays by John Singleton
Skinhead films
African-American films
1990s gang films
1990s American films
Bisexuality-related films